Somdev Devvarman was the defending champion, but he decided not to start this year.
Harel Levy defeated 6–4, 4–6, 6–2 Alex Kuznetsov in the final.

Seeds

Draw

Final four

Top half

Bottom half

References
 Main Draw
 Qualifying Draw

Fifth Third Bank Tennis Championships - Singles
2009 MS